Florine of Burgundy (1083–1097 at Philomelium) was a French crusader. 

Florine was the daughter of Duke Odo I of Burgundy and Sybilla of Burgundy. Florine and her husband, Sweyn the Crusader, led fifteen hundred horsemen to the First Crusade, and were surprised by the Turks whilst advancing rapidly across the plains of Cappadocia.  Outnumbered, Sweyn defended himself during a whole day, without being able to repulse the Turks with all the efforts of his courage or the battle-axes of his warriors; Florine valiantly fought by his side. Pierced by seven arrows, but still fighting, she sought with Sweyn to open a passage towards the mountains, when they were overwhelmed by their enemies. They fell together on the field of battle at Philomelium, after having seen all their knights and most faithful servants perish around them.

Fiction

Florine's life was dramatized by William Bernard McCabe in the novel Florine, Princess of Burgundy: A Tale of the First Crusaders, published in 1855.

References
Edgington, Susan; Sarah Lambert (2002). Gendering the Crusades. Columbia University Press. pp. 53–54. .

1083 births
1097 deaths
Christians of the First Crusade
Women in medieval European warfare
Women in 11th-century warfare
Women in war in Western Asia